Samar, officially the Province of Samar, formerly named Western Samar, is a province in the Philippines located in the Eastern Visayas region. Its capital is the city of Catbalogan. It is bordered by Northern Samar, Eastern Samar, Leyte and Leyte Gulf, and includes several islands in the Samar Sea. Samar is connected to the island of Leyte via the San Juanico Bridge.

In 1768, Leyte and modern Samar were created out of the historical province of Samar.  In 1965, Northern and Eastern Samar were created.

Fishing and agriculture are the major economic activities in the province.

On 8 November 2013, the province was significantly damaged by Typhoon Yolanda (Haiyan), particularly the towns of Basey, Marabut and Santa Rita.

Etymology
Samar is said to derive from the word Samad, a Visayan word for "wound" or "cut", describing the rough physical features of the land which is rugged and deeply dissected by streams.

History

 2 million-8000 B.C — Based on geologic findings, during the ice ages (2 million years – 8000 B.C), the islands of Mindoro, Luzon, and Mindanao were connected as one big island through the islands of Samar, Leyte and Bohol.
 8550 B.C. — Diggings in Sohoton Caves in Basey, Samar showed stone flake tools dated 8550 B.C.
 1200 — Other diggings along the Basey River revealed other stone flakes used until the 13th century.
 1543 — The explorer Ruy López de Villalobos, first came to the island and named it Las Islas Filipinas.
 1596 — Many names (such as Samal, Ibabao, Tandaya) were given to Samar Island prior to the coming of the Spaniards in 1596. The name "Samar" was derived from the local language samad, meaning "wound" or "cut", aptly describing the rough physical features of the island, rugged and deeply dissected by streams. During the early days of Spanish occupation, Samar was under the jurisdiction of Cebu.
 Arrival of the First Catholic Missionaries (Jesuits) — On October 15, 1596, the first Jesuit missionaries arrived in Tinago (now Dapdap) in Tarangnan. From Tinago, the missionaries, Fr. Francisco de Otazo, Bartolome Martes and Domingo Alonzo began teaching Catechism, healing the sick and spreading the Christian faith into the interior settlements.
 1649 to 1650 — On June 1, 1649, the people of Palapag led by Agustin Sumuroy revolted against the decree of Governor General Diego Fajardo requiring able bodied men from the Visayas for service at the Cavite Shipyards. Like wildfire, the revolt quickly spread to the neighboring town in the Northern and Western coast of Samar and to the nearby provinces of Bicol, Surigao, Cebu, Camiguin and as far as Zamboanga. It was suppressed in 1650 by the combined forces of the Spaniards, Lutaos, and Pampangos.
 1735 — Samar and Leyte were united into one province with Carigara, in Leyte, as the capital town.
 1747 — Samar and Leyte were separated for administrative effectiveness.
 1762 — Complaints from the Jesuits that the division was not working well, thus it was reunited again by the approval from the King of Spain.
 1768 — Jesuits were expelled in all Spanish dominions. The Franciscans arrived on September 25, 1768, and took over the administration of 14 of the 17 parishes which were under the spiritual care of the Jesuits for almost 172 years. The administration of the remaining three parishes namely Guiuan, Balangiga and Basey in the south of Samar were given to the Augustinians.
 1777 — The two provinces were divided for the last time, it was approved in Madrid in 1786 and had been effective in 1799.
 1803 — Guiuan, Balangiga and Basey were turned over to the Franciscans for the lack of Augustinian priests. 
 Royal Decree declares Samar as a Province — On August 11, 1841, Queen Isabella II of Spain signed a Royal Decree declaring Samar as a province.
 1900 — The Battle of Catubig (April 15–18, 1900) occurred during the Philippine–American War. On April 15, 1900, the Filipino guerrillas launched a surprise attack on a detachment of the US 43rd Infantry Regiment, forcing the Americans to abandon Catubig town after the four-day siege.
 1901 — The Balangiga massacre occurred during the Philippine–American War. September 28, 1901, the people of Balangiga, Giporlos, Lawaan and Quinapondan in Eastern Samar surprised and attacked the American forces stationed there, killing 48 American soldiers. To avenge their defeat, American general Jacob H. Smith ordered his men to turn Samar into a "howling wilderness".
 1910 — On April 10, 1910, upon the papal bull of Pope Pius X separated the islands of Samar and Leyte from the Diocese of Cebu and erected the Diocese of Calbayog comprising both islands. Pablo Singzon de Anunciacion was named first Bishop and consecrated on June 12, 1910.
 1942 — The occupying Imperial Japanese forces arrived in the province of Samar.
 1944 — The Battle off Samar took place on October 24 as Vice Admiral Takeo Kurita's Center Force warships clashed with several allied naval vessels in a collision course. Despite being a tactical victory for the Imperial Japanese Navy, it did not alter the course of the Philippines campaign.
 1965 — On June 19, the Philippine Congress along with the three Samar Representatives, Eladio T. Balite (1st District), Fernando R. Veloso (2nd District) and Felipe J. Abrigo (3rd District), approved Republic Act No. 4221 dividing the region of Samar into three divisions: Northern Samar, Eastern Samar, and Western Samar. Each region adopted a new capital: Catbalogan (Western Samar), Borongan (Eastern Samar), and Catarman (Northern Samar).
 1969 — On June 21, under Republic Act No. 5650, Western Samar was renamed Samar with Catbalogan still as the capital.
 2013 — On November 8, Typhoon Haiyan, locally known as Typhoon Yolanda hit Samar province. More than 300 people perished on the first day it hit the province.
 2018 — On late June, a friendly fire incident happened between Philippine National Police and the Armed Forces of the Philippines under the administration of Rodrigo Duterte. The incident led to the death of numerous police officials of Waray ethnic origin.
 2019  House Bill No. 8824 was introduced in the House of Representatives on January 22, 2019, by then-Representative Edgar Mary Sarmiento to establish a new province called "Northwest Samar", consisting of 9 municipalities and 1 city of Samar's 1st congressional district, of which Calbayog would be the designated capital. The bill is yet to be reviewed.

Geography
Samar province covers a total area of  occupying the central-western sections of the Samar island in the Eastern Visayas region. The province is bordered on the north by Northern Samar, east by Eastern Samar, south by Leyte and Leyte Gulf, and west by the Samar Sea.

Topography

The largest lowlands are located along the northern coast extending up to the valleys of Catubig and Catarman rivers. Smaller lowlands in Samar are to be found in the Calbayog area and on the deltas and small valleys of Gandara and Ulot rivers. Slopes are generally steep and barren of trees due to deforestation. Run-off waters after heavy rains can provoke flooding in low-lying areas and the erosion of the mountains enlarges the coastal plains of the province.

Climate and rainfall
Areas near the eastern coast of the province have no dry season (with a pronounced maximum rain period usually occurring from December to January), and are thus open to the northeast monsoon. Municipalities in the southeastern section of the province experience this type of climate.

Areas located in the northwestern portion of the province have a more or less evenly distributed rainfall throughout the year.

Administrative divisions
The province of Samar comprises two congressional districts, 24 municipalities and two component cities. It has a total of 952 barangays.

Demographics

Religion
Samar (Western Samar) is predominantly Roman Catholic. The Catholic Hierarchy (2014) states that 95 percent of its population adhere to Roman Catholicism. Some other Christian believers constitute most of the remainder such as Rizalista, Iglesia Filipina Independiente, Born-again Christians, Iglesia ni Cristo, Baptists, Methodists, Jehovah's Witnesses, The Church of Jesus Christ of Latter-day Saints, Seventh-day Adventist and Members Church of God International (MCGI). Muslims are also present and a few mosques are located within the province.

Languages and dialects

Residents of Samar are mostly Waray, the fifth largest cultural-linguistic group in the country. 90.2 percent of the household population speaks the Waray-Waray language, while 9.8 percent also speak Cebuano; 8.1 percent Boholano; 0.07 percent Tagalog; and 0.5 percent other languages.

There are two types of Waray spoken in the province, Waray Lineyte-Samarnon which is spoken from the southernmost tip of the province up to the municipality of Gandara and Waray Calbayog, an intermediary between the Waray of Northern Samar and the Waray of Samar, spoken in Calbayog, Santa Margarita, and in some parts of Tagapul-an, Santo Niño, Almagro and Matuguinao.

Economy

Former governors

Notable personalities

19th & 20th Centuries

 Senate President José Avelino —  the first President of the Senate of the Third Republic of the Philippines and the second President of the Liberal Party came from Calbayog, Samar. He was Senate President pro tempore to President Manuel Quezon prior to the establishment of the Commonwealth. He was the grandfather of Filipino actor Paulo Avelino.
Lieutenant Benedicto Nijaga— nicknamed Biktoy, one of the "Thirteen Martyrs of Bagumbayan", executed on January 11, 1897, in Bagumbayan (Luneta Park). During a raid of a printing press in Binondo, the Spaniards found and confiscated subversive documents including a list of members of the Katipunan. Benedicto Nijaga was on the list as a collector of revolutionary funds. Upon the order of Gov. Polavieja to arbitrarily arrest all suspected members of the Katipunan, Nijaga was arrested while he was campaigning for revolutionary funds.
Cardinal Julio Rosales — (September 18, 1906 – June 2, 1983) the second Archbishop of Cebu, was a Filipino cardinal of the Roman Catholic Church. A native of Calbayog, he made his studies at the Seminary of Calbayog and was ordained in his hometown on June 2, 1929. From 1929 to 1946, he did pastoral work in the diocese of Calbayog. He was consecrated bishop of Tagbilaran on September 21, 1946.
Lucio Godina (March 8, 1908 – November 24, 1936) & Simplicio Godina (March 8, 1908 - December 8, 1936) — were pygopagus conjoined twins from the island of Samar in the Philippines. Born in 1908, these boys from the Philippines later made the trip to the United States, where they became sideshow attractions in such hubs of ‘entertainment’ as Coney Island. In 1928, after various legal difficulties – including narrowly avoiding jail when a man was injured in an alleged drunk driving incident – they married identical (but not conjoined) twin sisters, Natividad and Victorina Matos, in Manila. At the age of 21 they married Natividad and Victorina Matos, who were identical twins. They performed in various sideshow acts, including in an orchestra on Coney Island and in dance with their wives. After Lucio died of rheumatic fever in New York City, doctors operated to separate him from Simplicio. Simplicio survived the operation, but died shortly thereafter due to spinal meningitis.

21st Century

Nemesio Baldesco— a pedicab driver from Calbayog who earned respect in the field of literary works in Waray. He is a recipient of Gawad Parangal of UMPIL (Unyon ng mga Manunulat sa Pilipinas). He is known as the “Father of Waray Poetry” (Amay han Siday).
Dr. Carmelita Abdurahman — she served as commissioner for Samar-Leyte language at Komisyon sa Wikang Filipino (KWF).
Archbishop Pedro Rosales Dean, Jr., D.D., Ph.L., S.T.L. — (born 21 February 1930) is the Archbishop emeritus of Palo from Calbayog since the appointment of Archbishop Jose S. Palma as his successor. He served the Archdiocese of Palo from 12 October 1985 until 18 March 2006.
Chito S. Roño —(born April 26, 1954), also known as Sixto Kayko, is a Filipino writer, film producer and film director from Calbayog known for his expansive vision and special-effects-heavy films, most notably Yamashita: The Tiger's Treasure (2001) for which he won the Metro Manila Film Festival for best director. He is also known for his 1997 film Nasaan ang Puso which earned him his first MMFF for best director. There is an annual literary and visual arts competition held in Samar in honor of him.
Tessie Tomas — (born October 31, 1950), a Filipino actress and TV host from Catbalogan, best known for being the host of the ABS-CBN talk show Teysi ng Tahanan. In an interview with GMA Network's Tunay Na Buhay, Tomas recalled working for an ad agency prior to her career as a presenter and actress. Tessie later appeared in both comedic and dramatic roles, notably in the 2012 remake of the film Mundo Man ay Magunaw and 2015's Buena Familia. In 2018, Tomas played a supporting role in the ABS-CBN soap opera The Blood Sisters.
Michael Cinco— a Filipino fashion designer from Catbalogan, Samar. He launched his eponymous fashion line in Dubai in 2003.
Rosalio "Yoyong" Martires — (born September 9, 1951), a former Filipino basketball player, actor and comedian from Catbalogan. He played for San Miguel in the Manila Industrial and Commercial Athletic Association and the Philippine Basketball Association between 1972 and 1982. In 1972, he appeared at the Olympic Games in Munich, Germany as a member of the country's national basketball team. He was a fleet footed guard specializing in steals/interceptions and assists.
Bishop Maximiano Tuazon Cruz — born in Catbalogan, Philippines and was ordained a priest on November 30, 1947. He was appointed titular bishop to Tanudaia as well as auxiliary bishop to the Diocese of Calbayog on November 10, 1987, and ordained bishop on December 1, 1987. He was appointed bishop to the Diocese of Calbayog on December 21, 1994, and retired from diocese on January 13, 1999. He died on October 9, 2013, at age 90.
Rosita “Rose” Bradborn — (born on 1973) is an Philippines international lawn bowler from Daram, Samar. She competed at the 2008 World Outdoor Bowls Championship and 2012 World Outdoor Bowls Championship but came to prominence when winning a bronze medal at the 2016 World Outdoor Bowls Championship in Christchurch in the fours with Hazel Jagonoy, Ronalyn Greenlees and Sonia Bruce. In 2018, he bagged three medals again in international tourneys.
Sergio Apostol — (born January 17, 1935) is a Filipino politician born in Catbalogan. In 2008, Sergio Apostol was Chief Presidential Legal Counsel for Philippine President Gloria Macapagal Arroyo. On October 8, 2008, Eduardo Ermita confirmed Apostol's resignation, effective October 30, to prepare for his candidacy, for Leyte congressional seat, in the 2010 Philippine general election. Apostol is a member of the board of Union Bank and the legal consultant of the SSS’ Social Security Commission (SSC). After winning his district's seat as a Lakas-CMD party candidate of Arroyo, Apostol switched allegiance to the Liberal party of Benigno Aquino, the winner of the 2010 Presidential election.
Justice Antonio Eduardo Nachura— former Associate Justice of the Supreme Court of the Philippines from Catbalogan, Samar. He took his oath of office as Associate Justice on February 7, 2007, and occupied the position until his mandatory retirement on June 13, 2011. Previously, Nachura had been Solicitor-General of the Philippines at the time his appointment to the Court was announced on January 31, 2007, by then-Philippine President Gloria Macapagal Arroyo.
Romero Federico Saenz Quimbo — (born December 12, 1969), also known as Miro Quimbo, is a Filipino politician who currently represents Marikina's 2nd Legislative District in the House of Representatives of the Philippines. He succeeded then-Rep. Del R. De Guzman who won as mayor. Quimbo spent the first two years of elementary school at the Sacred Heart College (now Saint Mary’s College of Catbalogan) in Catbalogan, Samar. He moved to the Marist School in Marikina where he eventually finished his elementary and secondary education.
Tom Rodriguez — a TV host, singer and actor from Catbalogan, Samar. He was born in Subic Naval Base in Zambales to an American serviceman father and a Filipina mother. One of six siblings, he moved with his two brothers and three sisters with their mother to Pinabacdao, Samar (where their mother hails from). But they grew up in nearby Catbalogan, also in Samar, where Rodriguez studied at Saint Mary's College of Catbalogan (formerly Sacred Heart College) from kindergarten to elementary. He popularized the OPM song “Ikaw Ang Sagot”.
Mel Senen Sarmiento — a Calbayognon politician who was a former member of the Philippine House of Representatives representing the 1st Legislative District of Samar from 2010 to 2016. He also served as Secretary General of the Liberal Party. He served as the Vice Mayor of Calbayog from 1992 to 1995 and Mayor from 2001 to 2010. He was also the Secretary General of the League of Cities of the Philippines from 2004 to 2010. He also served as the final Secretary of the Interior and Local Government under President Benigno Aquino III after Jesse Robredo and Mar Roxas.

Proposed creation of Samar Administrative Region (SamAR)
There is a proposed creation of Samar Administrative Region or SamAR, in which Eastern Visayas will be partitioned into two separate regions. Since the creation of Negros Island Region out of the regions of Western Visayas and Central Visayas, non-government organizations, local government units and people from the three Samar Island provinces are now expressing their support and willingness to put the provinces of Samar, Northern Samar and Eastern Samar into one separate administrative region in order to boost its economy, improve and directly provide to its people the government's basic and other public services and lower its poverty rate incidence, since Samar island's three provinces are listed as one of the poorest provinces of the Philippines.

References

External links 

 
 
 
 Samar News.com—based in Catbalogan, it is a source of news and information on Eastern Visayas.
 Province of Samar—Profile of the Samar province
 Local Governance Performance Management System

 
Provinces of the Philippines
Provinces of Eastern Visayas
States and territories established in 1965
1965 establishments in the Philippines